Abrazo West Campus is an acute-care community hospital located in Goodyear, Arizona, United States. Abrazo West is part of the Abrazo Community Health Network chain of hospitals and is designated by the American College of Surgeons 
 and the state of Arizona as a Level 1 Trauma Center. The hospital receives approximately 55,000 emergency patients annually.

Services
 179 total staffed beds
 Orthopedics
 Stroke care 
 Wound care 
 24-hour Emergency care services

Abrazo Buckeye Emergency Center
Abrazo Buckeye Emergency Center (formerly West Valley Emergency Center) is a 14-bed emergency center located in Buckeye, Arizona. The Emergency Center is operated and staffed by Abrazo West Campus. Operated by Abrazo West Campus, this comprehensive emergency facility is located in Buckeye and staffed by board-certified emergency physicians and specialty-certified nurses who provide 24-hour care. The facility offers CT scans, ultrasound and other diagnostic imaging services, and an on-site laboratory.

See also
 Tenet Healthcare

References

 Arizona Republic.

External links
 Abrazo West Campus
 Abrazo Community Health Network

Tenet Healthcare
Hospital buildings completed in 2003
Hospitals in Arizona
Trauma centers